The Progressive Labour Party (PLP) was a left-wing political party in Australia.

History 
The party was founded by dissident former members of the Australian Labor Party and the original Communist Party of Australia in 1996. The party claims that the ALP has abandoned its traditional working-class supporters as it has moved towards the political right. The party ran Senate tickets in New South Wales and Western Australia and contested several House of Representatives seats at the 9 October 2004 election.

The party regularly makes submissions to Senate and other committees on a broad range of issues.

Rod Noble, the national secretary of the Progressive Labour Party, described the Progressive Labor Party as a "broad alliance" of socialists. Blogger Andy Fleming stated the group has "been largely eclipsed" since the formation of Socialist Alliance. The party was de-registered by the Australian Electoral Commission in December 2006. The party merged with the Australian Progressives in 2021, with the merged party being deregistered due to having insufficient members the following year.

References

External links 
 
 Progressive Labour policies

1996 establishments in Australia
2021 disestablishments in Australia
Defunct political parties in Australia
Labour parties
Political parties established in 1996
Political parties disestablished in 2021
Socialist parties in Australia